James Earl Fobert,  (born November 5, 1962) is a British architect and designer.

Career 
Jamie Fobert studied architecture in his native Canada, at the University of Toronto. He arrived in London in 1988 and was employed for eight years at David Chipperfield Architects. During that time, he worked on a house for Nick Knight. In 1996, he established his own practice, Jamie Fobert Architects.
 
Since then, his work has ranged from individual houses to retail, including Givenchy and Versace, and significant public buildings for the arts. His practice has won a number of public commissions for cultural organizations including Tate St Ives and Kettle's Yard and, due to be completed in 2023, the National Portrait Gallery, London.

He is a Trustee of the Camden Arts Centre and The Architecture Foundation. In 2020, he was appointed CBE in the Queen's New Year Honours, for services to architecture.

Awards 

Jamie Fobert Architects has won awards including several RIBA Awards. In 2018, Tate St Ives was awarded the Art Fund Museum of the Year and was shortlisted for the RIBA Stirling Prize. In 2019, the practice won the BD Architect of the Year Award, in recognition of an outstanding body of work in the field of public buildings.

References 

1962 births
Living people
20th-century British architects
Canadian emigrants to the United Kingdom
Commanders of the Order of the British Empire
21st-century British architects
People from Ontario
University of Toronto alumni